Bart van Muyen (born 19 December 1982 in Rotterdam) is a former Dutch professional footballer who played during his career as a defender for FC Dordrecht and FC Oss in the Dutch Eerste Divisie.

External links
 Voetbal International

1982 births
Living people
Dutch footballers
FC Dordrecht players
TOP Oss players
Eerste Divisie players
Footballers from Rotterdam

Association football defenders
ASWH players